C. Govindarajan (15 September 1921 – 26 January 2008) was a freedom fighter, Indian politician, and former Member of the Legislative Assembly of Tamil Nadu. He was one of the founder-members of the CPI(M) Tamilnadu, he worked for the growth of the party in the Unified South Arcot District. He had also served as the party State Committee member for a long time. He was elected to the Tamil Nadu legislative assembly as a Communist Party of India (Marxist) candidate from Nellikuppam constituency in 1967 and 1977 elections.

References 

1921 births
2008 deaths
 Communist Party of India (Marxist) politicians from Tamil Nadu